The sport of Ironman was developed in 1964 in Australia by Valentine Trainor to combine the four main disciplines of surf lifesaving into a single race; swimming, board paddling, ski paddling and running. The sport should not be confused with Ironman triathlon. It is typically run as a single event as a part of a surf life saving carnival, although it can be run as a sport in its own right. Internationally it is sometimes called Oceanman

History
After the creation of the Surf Lifesaving movement in 1907, members needed a way to stay fit and hone their skills in between patrols. Thus, in 1915, the first NSW Titles were held. These early titles held traditional events such as the boat race, march past, R&R and surf races. On a 1964 Australian tour of California, the competitors came across an event known as the 'Taplin', which involved a swim, ski, board legs, with running transitions. This became the ironman race. In 1966, it was first held at the Australian Championships at Coolangatta beach, and was won by Hayden Kenny.

Perhaps the most famous ironman was Grant Kenny, who in 1980 at the age of 16 made the event famous by winning the Australian Junior and Australian Open Ironman championships within the space of half an hour. Grant became a national hero, appearing on cereal boxes and television advertisements, and was seen as the pinnacle of Aussie sportsmen. The short Ironman event became famous and the centre of attention at all surf carnivals.

In the early 1980s a movie was made called The Coolangatta Gold, about an ironman event that required competitors to complete a  course along Queensland's Gold Coast. A circuit was then developed that mixed 10-minute Ironman races with the 'Coolangatta Gold', and a range of other professional Ironman events around Australia.

In 1989 an elite group of Ironmen took the sport one step further and created an ironman event for TV. The event was named the Uncle Toby's Super Series and was initially very successful, but after 10 years of big television ratings, the retirement of a few of the sports biggest start lead to a decline in its popularity in the late 1990s. This led to the end of the Uncle Toby's Super Series in the 2000/2001 season. An attempt to revive the series was made in 2011 with the introduction of Kellogg's Nutri-Grain Ironman Series which was also televised on Network Ten however by 2011 the Australian sporting television landscape had changed, meaning live, free to air sport didn't command the same viewing numbers as the 1990s and therefore didn't support as high a level of commercial support and funding. Whilst those that watched the revived series found it highly entertaining, attracting the required large numbers proved to be an uphill battle.

In 2013, the Kellogg's Ironman series switched to the larger viewing base of Channel 9 and Wide World of Sports.  They also reverted to 5 pre-recorded rounds followed by a live final.  This was deemed to be a successful transition and at least temporarily breathed life back into the Australian Profession Ironman circuit.  It may be a while before the return to the "household name" days of Grant Kenny, Trevor Hendy, Guy Leech and Darren Mercer but has given a new platform to young Ironman stars, Shannon and Caine Eckstein, Ky Hurst, Matt Poole, Tannin Lyndon, Ali Day and Kendrick Louis.

Races
The typical Ironman race consists of a water leg of either swim, ski or board, that lasts about 3–4 minutes, with a course going out through the break, around a set of turning buoys, and back in. It then has a run of about 150m, around two flags on the beach, before the next water leg in a similar fashion to the first. This continues for the third water leg, before a final run to the finish line. The order for each water leg is determined at the start of every carnival by random draw. The distances for each leg vary upon conditions, however they are around 800m for the ski leg, 600m for the board, 400m for the swim and 150m for each run leg.

Ski
The surf ski is an 18-foot long kayak, that is especially designed for going in and out of the surf. Because of its lack of stability, it can often be the most challenging in rough conditions, however, because it is the fastest, it allows the competitor to be aggressive when it comes to getting out through surf and in chop. The Ski course is around three buoys, set in an apex course.

Swim
For the swim leg, the competitors are required to swim around the 'string line', a line of 9 coloured buoys. Perhaps the most technically demanding of the legs, because it requires the athlete to swim under waves whilst swimming out to sea, and bodysurfing them on the way back in. Because of the often rough nature of the water, ironmen must be very proficient at swimming. The best swimmers in an ironmen field are often close to Olympic standard, such as Ky Hurst, whilst training for three other disciplines.

Board
The board leg involves paddling a modified Malibu paddle board around a set of four black-and-white string lines. Going out through the surf can be quite difficult, as athletes must use their weight to 'pop' over each wave. However, on the way in is relatively simple, as the athlete must only prevent the board from nosediving. As such, many big waves can be caught in the board leg.

Run
A relatively short and easier leg in the ironman race. The run leg involves running from the edge of the surf, around two flags set on the beach, and back out into the surf. Because of this, the surface can change very quickly from wet to hard to soft and back again, so the ironman must change his running technique regularly.

Start
As the order of the ironman changes for every race, the start procedure changes for the first leg. For a swim first, the athletes will line up on the sand and run into the water. For board first, they will line up in a similar fashion, but with their boards under their arms. For ski first, they will start on the water's edge, next to their ski, and jump in when the gun fires.

Major Events
While ironman races are held at every surf carnival, there are some major events that attract prize money, sponsorship and television coverage.

Australian Ironman Championship results
Held at the Australian Surf Life Saving Championships every year, the Australian Ironman Title is awarded to the winner at this event. The format is the same as for typical surf carnivals, a ten- to twelve-minute race with a field of sixteen, with the first eight competing in the final. The blue ribbon event at the carnival, and also the one that attracts the most attention in terms of television and spectators on the beach. It is typically the last event on the program, raced on a Sunday afternoon
.

World Championship
Held at the World titles every two years. Carries none of the prestige of an Australian Championship, the field at the beginning of the carnival is usually smaller, and is not raced in as tricky conditions. The World Ironman Champion is decided from the results of the World Interclub Championships.

The Coolangatta Gold
The ultra-endurance marathon from Surfer's Paradise to Coolangatta and back. The Coolangatta Gold is the toughest race in ironman, and one of the toughest in world sport.

The Ironman Series
First known as the Kellogg's Nutri-Grain Grand Prix in 1986, before the creation of the Uncle Toby's Super Series in 1989, and then the Kellogg's Nutri-Grain Ironman Series in 2002. The Ironman Series has always involved a variety of formats and locations, making it tough for any one athlete to dominate. The Series over the years has given a much greater profile to the sport and its athletes, and has allowed many athletes to become semi-professional.

References

External links
History of Surf Lifesaving from SLSA website
International Life Saving Federation website
The History Of Surf Ironman on Youtube

Sport in Australia
Sports originating in Australia
Surf lifesaving
Lifesaving in Australia
History of Gold Coast, Queensland